Wheal Frances is a village in Cornwall, England, UK. It is located in the civil parish of Perranzabuloe.

Geography
To the north Carnkief Pond, a Site of Special Scientific Interest is named. This SSSI is noted for its biological interest, including 12 species of dragonfly.

Wheal Frances Mine
The village was noted for the Wheal Frances Mine of which many ruins remain.

References

Villages in Cornwall
Tin mines in Cornwall
Sites of Special Scientific Interest in Cornwall
Industrial archaeological sites in Cornwall